Refusing to assist a police officer, peace officer or other law enforcement officer is an offence in various jurisdictions around the world. Some jurisdictions use the terminology '"refusing to aid a police officer" or "failure to aid a police officer".

This principle originates from Norman England, where local Sheriffs in England would be the only peace officer in an area. He would summon assistance from locals in order to enforce the King's laws or to apprehend an offender. It subsequently became part of the common law that all persons must assist a constable or peace officer when so requested. This still remains as one of the few common law offences which exist in England/Wales and some other states/countries.

Canada

Canada Criminal Code (R.S.C., 1985, c. C-46)
See 129(b) for circumstances where it is a crime not to act in the assistance of the police.

129 Everyone who

(a) resists or wilfully obstructs a public officer or peace officer in the execution of his duty or any person lawfully acting in aid of such an officer,
(b) omits, without reasonable excuse, to assist a public officer or peace officer in the execution of his duty in arresting a person or in preserving the peace, after having reasonable notice that he is required to do so, or
(c) resists or wilfully obstructs any person in the lawful execution of a process against lands or goods or in making a lawful distress or seizure,
is guilty of:

1. an indictable offence and is liable to imprisonment for a term not exceeding two years, or 
2. an offence punishable on summary conviction.

R.S., c. C-34, s. 118; 1972, c. 13, s. 7.

England/Wales
Refusing to assist a constable is an offence under the common law of England and Wales. The offence is committed if a person refuses, without lawful excuse, to assist a constable who sees a breach of the peace committed or who is assaulted or obstructed when making an arrest, and who, where there is reasonable necessity to do so, calls upon that person to assist him or her. As a common law offence, it is punishable with an unlimited fine and imprisonment, although it is very rarely prosecuted. There have been no prosecutions since 2011 for this offence.

United States

Various jurisdictions require an individual to assist a law enforcement officer when requested, to varying levels of criminal punishment, from violation to misdemeanor:

Federal

Customs

§507. Officers to make character known; assistance for officers

(a) Every customs officer shall—
(1) upon being questioned at the time of executing any of the powers conferred upon him, make known his character as an officer of the Federal Government; and
(2) have the authority to demand the assistance of any person in making any arrest, search, or seizure authorized by any law enforced or administered by customs officers, if such assistance may be necessary.

If a person, without reasonable excuse, neglects or refuses to assist a customs officer upon proper demand under paragraph (2), such person is guilty of a misdemeanor and subject to a fine of not more than $1,000.
(b) Any person other than an officer or employee of the United States who renders assistance in good faith upon the request of a customs officer shall not be held liable for any civil damages as a result of the rendering of such assistance if the assisting person acts as an ordinary, reasonably prudent person would have acted under the same or similar circumstances.
(R.S. §3071; Pub. L. 99–570, title III, §3152, Oct. 27, 1986, 100 Stat. 3207–94.)

Alabama

Ala Code § 13A-10-5 : Alabama Code - Section 13A-10-5:

Refusing to aid peace officer 

(a) A person commits the crime of refusing to aid a peace officer if, upon command by a peace officer identified to him as such, he fails or refuses to aid such peace officer in:

(1) Effecting or securing a lawful arrest; or

(2) Preventing the commission by another person of any offense.

(b) A person is not liable under this section if the failure or refusal to aid the officer was reasonable under the circumstances. The burden of injecting this issue is on the defendant, but this does not shift the burden of proof.

(c) Refusing to aid a peace officer is a Class C misdemeanor.

Alaska

Title 11. Criminal Law
Chapter 56. Offenses Against Public Administration
Section 720. Refusing to Assist a Peace Officer or Judicial Officer.

AS 11.56.720. Refusing to Assist a Peace Officer or Judicial Officer.

(a) A person commits the offense of refusing to assist a peace officer or judicial officer if, upon a request, command, or order by someone the person knows to be a peace officer or judicial officer, that person unreasonably fails to make a good faith effort to physically assist the officer in the exercise of official duties.

(b) A person who, without expecting compensation, assists a person in accordance with this section is not liable for civil damages as a result of an act or omission in rendering that assistance. This subsection does not preclude liability for civil damages as a result of reckless, wilful, wanton, or intentional misconduct.

(c) Refusing to assist a peace officer or judicial officer is a violation.

Arizona

13-2403. Refusing to aid a peace officer; classification

A. A person commits refusing to aid a peace officer if, upon a reasonable command by a person reasonably known to be a peace officer, such person knowingly refuses or fails to aid such peace officer in:
1. Effectuating or securing an arrest; or
2. Preventing the commission by another of any offense.
B. A person who complies with this section by aiding a peace officer shall not be held liable to any person for damages resulting therefrom, provided such person acted reasonably under the circumstances known to him at the time.
C. Refusing to aid a peace officer is a class 1 misdemeanor.

Arkansas

2010 Arkansas Code
Title 5 - Criminal Offenses
Subtitle 5 - Offenses Against The Administration Of Government
Chapter 54 - Obstructing Governmental Operations
Subchapter 1 - General Provisions
§ 5-54-109 - Refusing to assist law enforcement officer.

(a) A person commits the offense of refusing to assist a law enforcement officer if, upon command by a person known by him or her to be a law enforcement officer, the person unreasonably refuses or fails to assist in effecting a lawful arrest or preventing another person from committing an offense.

(b) Refusing to assist a law enforcement officer is a Class C misdemeanor. 
Disclaimer: These codes may not be the most recent version. Arkansas may have more current or accurate information. We make no warranties or guarantees about the accuracy, completeness, or adequacy of the information contained on this site or the information linked to on the state site. Please check official sources.

California

The following penal code was repealed on August 30, 2019 by governor Gavin Newsom with the passage and signing of California State Senate Bill 192. It is no longer a crime to refuse to help a police officer.

Penal Code - Section 142-181 

150.  Every able-bodied person above 18 years of age who neglects or refuses to join the posse comitatus or power of the county, by neglecting or refusing to aid and assist in taking or arresting any person against whom there may be issued any process, or by neglecting to aid and assist in retaking any person who, after being arrested or confined, may have escaped from arrest or imprisonment, or by neglecting or refusing to aid and assist in preventing any breach of the peace, or the commission of any criminal offense, being thereto lawfully required by any uniformed peace officer, or by any peace officer described in Section 830.1, subdivision (a), (b), (c), (d), (e), or (f) of Section 830.2, or subdivision (a) of Section 830.33, who identifies himself or herself with a badge or identification card issued by the officer's employing agency, or by any judge, is punishable by a fine of not less than fifty dollars ($50) nor more than one thousand dollars ($1,000).

Colorado

18-8-107. Refusing to aid a peace officer 

A person, eighteen years of age or older, commits a class 1 petty offense when, upon command by a person known to him to be a peace officer, he unreasonably refuses or fails to aid the peace officer in effecting or securing an arrest or preventing the commission by another of any offense.

Colorado Revised Statutes 2013 35 Title 16
16-3-202. Assisting peace officer - arrest - furnishing information - immunity.

(1) A peace officer making an arrest may command the assistance of any
person who is in the vicinity.
(2) A person commanded to assist a peace officer has the same authority to arrest
as the officer who commands his assistance.
(3) A person commanded to assist a peace officer in making an arrest shall not be
civilly or criminally liable for any reasonable conduct in aid of the officer or for any acts
expressly directed by the officer.
(4) Private citizens, acting in good faith, shall be immune from any civil liability
for reporting to any police officer or law enforcement authority the commission or
suspected commission of any crime or for giving other information to aid in the
prevention of any crime

30-10-516. Sheriffs to preserve peace - command aid

It is the duty of the sheriffs, undersheriffs, and deputies to keep and preserve the peace in their respective counties, and to quiet and suppress all affrays, riots, and unlawful assemblies and insurrections. For that purpose, and for the service of process in civil or criminal cases, and in apprehending or securing any person for felony or breach of the peace, they, and every coroner, may call to their aid such person of their county as they may deem necessary.

Connecticut

Sec. 53a-167b. Failure to assist a peace officer or firefighter: Class A misdemeanor. (a) A person is guilty of failure to assist a peace officer or firefighter when, commanded by a peace officer or firefighter authorized to command assistance, such person refuses to assist such peace officer or firefighter in the execution of such peace officer's or firefighter's duties.

Delaware

Del Code § 1241 : Delaware Code - Section 1241:
Refusing to Aid Police Officer; Class B Misdemeanor

A person is guilty of refusing to aid a police officer when, upon command by a police officer identifiable or identified by the officer as such, the person unreasonably fails or refuses to aid the police officer in effecting an arrest, or in preventing the commission by another person of any offense.

Refusing to aid a police officer is a class B misdemeanor.

Florida

843.06 Neglect or refusal to aid peace officers.

Whoever, being required in the name of the state by any officer of the Florida Highway Patrol, police officer, beverage enforcement agent, or watchman, neglects or refuses to assist him or her in the execution of his or her office in a criminal case, or in the preservation of the peace, or the apprehending or securing of any person for a breach of the peace, or in case of the rescue or escape of a person arrested upon civil process, shall be guilty of a misdemeanor of the second degree, punishable as provided in s. 775.082 or s. 775.083.

Georgia

2010 Georgia Code
Title 17 - Criminal Procedure
Chapter 4 - Arrest of Persons
Article 2 - Arrest by Law Enforcement Officers Generally

§ 17-4-24 - Duty of law enforcement officers to execute penal warrants; summoning of posses
O.C.G.A. 17-4-24 (2010)
17-4-24. Duty of law enforcement officers to execute penal warrants; summoning of posses 

Every law enforcement officer is bound to execute the penal warrants given to him to execute. He may summon to his assistance, either in writing or orally, any of the citizens of the neighborhood or county to assist in the execution of such warrants. The acts of the citizens formed as a posse by such officer shall be subject to the same protection and consequences as official acts.

2010 Georgia Code
Title 17 - Criminal Procedure
Chapter 13 - Criminal Extradition
Article 2 - Uniform Criminal Extradition Act

§ 17-13-29 - Authority of arresting officers; penalties for refusal to assist arresting officers
O.C.G.A. 17-13-29 (2010)
17-13-29. Authority of arresting officers; penalties for refusal to assist arresting officers

Every peace officer or other person empowered to make the arrest shall have the same authority, in arresting the accused, to command assistance therein as peace officers have by law in the execution of any criminal process directed to them, with like penalties against those who refuse their assistance.

Hawaii

013 Hawaii Revised Statutes
Title 37. Hawaii Penal Code
710. Offenses Against Public Administration
710-1011 Refusing to aid a law enforcement officer.

Universal Citation: HI Rev Stat § 710-1011 (2013)
§710-1011 Refusing to aid a law enforcement officer.

(1) A person commits the offense of refusing to aid a law enforcement officer when, upon a reasonable command by a person known to him to be a law enforcement officer, he intentionally refuses or fails to aid such law enforcement officer, in:
(a) Effectuating or securing an arrest; or
(b) Preventing the commission by another of any offense.
(2) Refusing to aid a law enforcement officer is a petty misdemeanor.
(3) A person who complies with this section by aiding a law enforcement officer shall not be held liable to any person for damages resulting therefrom, provided he acted reasonably under the circumstances known to him at the time. [L 1972, c 9, pt of §1; am L 2001, c 91, §4]

Idaho

Idaho Codes
Title 18 - Crimes and Punishments
Chapter 7: Arrests and Seizures of Persons — Special Officers
18-707 Refusing Assistance to Officers.

18-707. Refusing assistance to officers.

Every male person above eighteen (18) years of age who neglects or refuses to join the posse comitatus or power of the county, by neglecting or refusing to aid and assist in taking or arresting any person against whom there may be issued any process, or by neglecting to aid and assist in retaking any person who, after being arrested or confined, may have escaped from such arrest or imprisonment, or by neglecting or refusing to aid and assist in preventing any breach of the peace, or in commission of any criminal offense, being thereto lawfully required by any sheriff, deputy sheriff, coroner, constable, judge or other officer concerned in the administration of justice, is punishable by fine of not less than fifty dollars ($50.00) nor more than $1,000.

Illinois

(720 ILCS 5/31-8) (from Ch. 38, par. 31-8)
Sec. 31-8. Refusing to aid an officer.

Whoever upon command refuses or knowingly fails reasonably to aid a person known by him to be a peace officer in:

(a) Apprehending a person whom the officer is authorized to apprehend; or 
(b) Preventing the commission by another of any offense, commits a petty offense.

Indiana

Information Maintained by the Office of Code Revision Indiana Legislative Services Agency
IC 35-44.1-3
Chapter 3. Detention

IC 35-44.1-3-3
Refusal to aid an officer 
Sec. 3. A person who, when ordered by a law enforcement officer to assist the officer in the execution of the officer's duties, knowingly or intentionally, and without a reasonable cause, refuses to assist commits refusal to aid an officer, a Class B misdemeanor.
As added by P.L.126-2012, SEC.54.

Iowa

Code Section 719.2 

Refusing to Assist Officer.
Any person who is requested or ordered by any magistrate or peace officer to render the magistrate or officer assistance in making or attempting to make an arrest, or to prevent the commission of any criminal act, shall render assistance as required. A person who, unreasonably and without lawful cause, refuses or neglects to render assistance when so requested commits a simple misdemeanor.

Kansas

Chapter 22: Criminal Procedure
Kansas Code of Criminal Procedure
Article 27: Uniform Criminal Extradition Act

22-2709: Authority of arresting officer.

Every such peace officer or other person empowered to make the arrest, shall have the same authority, in arresting the accused, to command assistance therein, as peace officers have by law in the execution of any criminal process directed to them, with like penalties against those who refuse their assistance.
Universal Citation: KS Stat § 22-2407 (2017)
22-2407. Assisting law enforcement officer. (1) A law enforcement officer making an arrest may command the assistance of any person who may be in the vicinity.

(2) A person commanded to assist a law enforcement officer shall have the same authority to arrest as the officer who commands his assistance.

(3) A person commanded to assist a law enforcement officer in making an arrest shall not be civilly or criminally liable for any reasonable conduct in aid of the officer or any acts expressly directed by the officer.

History: L. 1970, ch. 129, § 22-2407; July 1.

Kentucky

440.240 Assistance in making arrest.
Every such peace officer or other person empowered to make the arrest, shall have the same authority, in arresting the accused, to command assistance therein, as peace officers have by law in the execution of any criminal process directed to them, with like penalties to those who refuse their assistance.

Louisiana

CCRP 219
Art. 219.  Officer may summon assistance

A peace officer making a lawful arrest may call upon as many persons as he considers necessary to aid him in making the arrest.  A person thus called upon shall be considered a peace officer for such purposes.

Maine

Title 30-A: Municipalities and Counties Heading: PL 1987, C. 737, PT. A, §2 (new)
Part 1: Counties Heading: PL 1987, C. 737, PT. A, §2 (NEW)
Chapter 1: County Officers Heading: PL 1987, C. 737, PT. A, §2 (NEW)
Subchapter 6: Sheriffs and Officers Heading: PL 1987, C. 737, PT. A, §2 (new)
Article 4: Duties Heading: PL 1987, C. 737, PT. A, §2 (NEW)

§402. Aid required by officer; refusal

1. Officer may require aid.  Any law enforcement officer may require suitable aid in the execution of official duties in criminal and traffic infraction cases for the following reasons:
A. For the preservation of the peace; or 
B. For apprehending or securing any person for the breach of the peace or in case of the escape or rescue of persons arrested on civil process.
2. Violation and penalty.  Any person required to aid a law enforcement officer under this section who neglects or refuses to do so commits a civil violation for which a forfeiture of not less than $3 nor more than $50 to be paid to the county may be adjudged[/u].

Section History
1987, c. 737, §§A2,C106 (NEW). 1989, c. 6, (AMD). 1989, c. 9, §2 (AMD). 1989, c. 104, §§C8,10 (AMD).

Maryland

Griffith v. Southland Corp.
94 Md. App. 242 (1992)
617 A.2d 598
David Griffith v. The Southland Corporation

KEESLING v. STATE - 8 April 1983 

Maryland Criminal Law Section 10-201
Article - Criminal Law
§ 10-201.

(3) A person may not willfully fail to obey a reasonable and lawful order that a law enforcement officer makes to prevent a disturbance to the public peace.
(d) A person who violates this section is guilty of a misdemeanor and on conviction is subject to imprisonment not exceeding 60 days or a fine not exceeding $500 or both.

Massachusetts

Part IV - Title I - Chapter 268 - Section 24
Neglect or refusal to assist an officer or watchman 

Whoever, being required in the name of the commonwealth by a sheriff, deputy sheriff, constable, police officer or watchman, neglects or refuses to assist him in the execution of his office in a criminal case, in the preservation of the peace or in the apprehension or securing of a person for a breach of the peace, or in a case of escape or rescue of persons arrested upon civil process, shall be punished by a fine of not more than fifty dollars or by imprisonment for not more than one month.

Michigan

The Michigan Penal Code
Act 328 of 1931 - Chapter LXX
Public Offices and Officers

750.483 Neglecting or refusing to aid sheriff, coroner or constable; misdemeanor.

Sec. 483. Neglecting or refusing to aid sheriff, etc.—Any person who being required by any sheriff, deputy sheriff, coroner or constable, shall neglect or refuse to assist him in the execution of his office, in any criminal case or in the preservation of the peace, or the apprehending or securing of any person for a breach of the peace, or in any case of escape or rescue of persons arrested upon civil process, shall be guilty of a misdemeanor.

Minnesota

2013 Minnesota Statutes
Chapters 625 - 634 — Criminal Procedure
Chapter 629 — Extradition, Detainers, Arrest, Bail
Section 629.09 — Powers of Officer

629.09 Powers of Officer.

Every such peace officer or other person empowered to make the arrest shall have the same authority, in arresting the accused, to command assistance therein, as peace officers have by law in the execution of any criminal process directed to them, with like penalties against those who refuse their assistance.

Mississippi

§ 99-3-5. All persons must aid arresting officer when commanded

Every person when commanded to do so by an officer seeking to arrest an offender, must aid and assist in making the arrest, and must obey the commands of the officer in respect thereto. Sources: Codes, 1857, ch. 64, art. 274; 1871, § 2774; 1880, § 3024; 1892, § 1373; 1906, § 1445; Hemingway's 1917, § 1202; 1930, § 1225; 1942, § 2468.

Missouri

2011 Missouri Revised Statutes
Title XXXVII Criminal Procedure
Section 548.091. Authority of arresting officer.

Universal Citation: MO Rev Stat § 548.091 

Authority of arresting officer.
548.091. Every such officer or other person empowered to make the arrest, shall have the same authority, in arresting the accused, to command assistance therein, as peace officers have by law in the execution of any criminal process directed to them, with like penalties against those who refuse their assistance.

Montana

Montana Code annotated 2015

45-7-304: Failure to aid peace officer

45-7-304. Failure to aid peace officer. (1) A peace officer may order a person to cooperate when it is reasonable for the peace officer to enlist the cooperation of that person in: 
(a) effectuating or securing an arrest of another pursuant to 46-6-402; or 
(b) preventing the commission by another of an offense. 
(2) A person commits the offense of failure to aid a peace officer if the person knowingly refuses to obey an order described in subsection (1). 
(3) A person convicted of the offense of failure to aid a peace officer shall be fined not to exceed $500 or be imprisoned in the county jail for a term not to exceed 6 months, or both.

History En. 94-7-304 by Sec. 1, Ch. 513, L. 1973; R.C.M. 1947, 94-7-304; amd. Sec. 1687, Ch. 56, L. 2009.

Nebraska

006.02O Disorderly Conduct - Disturbing the Peace 

Include all charges of committing a breach of the peace. Include affray, unlawful assembly, disturbing the peace, disturbing meetings, disorderly conduct in State institutions, at court, at fairs, on trains, or public conveyances, etc.; prize fights; blasphemy, profanity, and obscene language, desecrating the flag; refusing to assist an officer; and any attempts to commit any of these offenses.

2006 Nebraska Revised Statutes
§ 28-903 — Refusing to aid a peace officer; penalty.

Section 28-903
Refusing to aid a peace officer; penalty.
(1) A person commits the offense of refusing to aid a peace officer if, upon request by a person known to him to be a peace officer, he unreasonably refuses or fails to aid such peace officer in:
(a) Apprehending any person charged with or convicted of any offense against any of the laws of this state; or
(b) Securing such offender when apprehended; or
(c) Conveying such offender to the jail of the county.
(2) Refusing to aid a peace officer is a Class II misdemeanor.

Source - Laws 1977, LB 38, § 188

Nevada

Chapter 199
Crimes Against Public Justice
NRS 199.270  Refusal to make arrest or to aid officer.

NRS 199.270  Refusal to make arrest or to aid officer.  Every person who, after having been lawfully commanded by any magistrate to arrest another person, shall willfully neglect or refuse so to do, and every person who, after having been lawfully commanded to aid an officer in arresting any person, or in retaking any person who has escaped from lawful custody, or in executing any lawful process, shall willfully neglect or refuse to aid such officer shall be guilty of a misdemeanor.
[1911 C&P § 96; RL § 6361; NCL § 10045]

New Hampshire

Title LIX: Proceedings In Criminal Cases
Chapter 612: Uniform Criminal Extradition Law

612:9 Authority Of Arresting Officer

Every peace officer or other person empowered to make an arrest pursuant to RSA 612:8 shall have the same authority to command assistance in arresting the accused as peace officers have by law in the execution of any criminal process directed to them, with like penalties against those who refuse their assistance.

New Jersey

2009 New Jersey Code
Title 2A - Administration of Civil and Criminal Justice
2A:160-17 - Authority of officer making arrest;  assistance given

Every such peace officer or other person empowered to make the arrest, shall  have the same authority, in arresting the accused, to command assistance  therein, as peace officers have by law in the execution of any criminal process  directed to them, with like penalties against those who refuse their  assistance.

New Mexico

Chapter 30: Criminal Offenses
Article 22: Interference with Law Enforcement, 30-22-1 through 30-22-27
Section 30-22-2: Refusing to aid an officer.

Universal Citation: NM Stat § 30-22-2 (1996 through 1st Sess 50th Legis)

30-22-2. Refusing to aid an officer.
Refusing to aid an officer consists of refusing to assist any peace officer in the preservation of the peace when called upon by such officer in the name of the United States or the state of New Mexico.
Whoever commits refusing to aid an officer is guilty of a petty misdemeanor.

New York

Article 195 - NY Penal Law
NY Laws › Penal Law › Part 3 › Title L
Official Misconduct and Obstruction of Public Servant Generally

195.10 Refusing to aid a peace or a police officer.

A person is guilty of refusing to aid a peace or a police officer when, upon command by a peace or a police officer identifiable or identified to him as such, he unreasonably fails or refuses to aid such peace or a police officer in effecting an arrest, or in preventing the commission by another person of any offense.

Refusing to aid a peace or a police officer is a class B misdemeanor.

North Carolina

State v. Ditmore, 177 N.C. 592, 99 S.E. 368, states:
"It is his duty as a good citizen, and in obedience to the authority of the state as represented by a lawful officer, to aid in the arrest

NCGA - Chapter 106 Article 75.
Protection and Development of Forests; Fire Control

§ 106-899. Powers of forest rangers to prevent and extinguish fires; authority to issue 
citations and warning tickets.

(a) Forest rangers shall prevent and extinguish forest fires and shall have control and direction of all persons and equipment while engaged in the extinguishing of forest fires.

During a season of drought, the Commissioner or his designate may establish a fire patrol in any district, and in case of fire in or threatening any forest or woodland, the forest ranger shall attend forthwith and use all necessary means to confine and extinguish such fire. The forest ranger or deputy forest ranger may summon any resident between the ages of 18 and 45 years, 
inclusive, to assist in extinguishing fires and may require the use of crawler tractors and other property needed for such purposes; any person so summoned and who is physically able who refuses or neglects to assist or to allow the use of equipment and such other property required shall be guilty of a Class 3 misdemeanor and upon conviction shall only be subject to a fine of not less than fifty dollars ($50.00) nor more than one hundred dollars ($100.00). No action for trespass shall lie against any forest ranger, deputy forest ranger, or person summoned by him for crossing lands, backfiring, burning out or performing his duties as a forest ranger or deputy forest ranger

North Dakota

Chapter 29-06
Arrest
29-06-04. Persons must aid in making arrest.

29-06-03. Officer may summon aid to make arrest.
Any officer making an arrest may summon as many persons orally as the officer deems
necessary to aid the officer therein.
29-06-04. Persons must aid in making arrest.
Every person, when required, shall aid an officer in the making of an arrest.

Ohio

Ohio Revised Code » Title [29] XXIX Crimes - Procedure » Chapter 2921:
Offences Against Justice and Public Administration
2921.23 Failure to aid a law enforcement officer

(A) No person shall negligently fail or refuse to aid a law enforcement officer, when called upon for assistance in preventing or halting the commission of an offense, or in apprehending or detaining an offender, when such aid can be given without a substantial risk of physical harm to the person giving it.

(B) Whoever violates this section is guilty of failure to aid a law enforcement officer, a minor misdemeanor.

Oklahoma

2006 Oklahoma code - Title 21. Crimes and Punishments
§21-537.  Refusing to aid officer.

Every person who, after having been lawfully commanded to aid any officer in arresting any person or in retaking any person who has escaped from legal custody, or in executing any legal process, willfully neglects or refuses to aid such officer, is guilty of a misdemeanor.

Oregon

2013 ORS > Vol. 4 > Chapter 162 > Obstructing Governmental Administration
§ 162.245¹ - Refusing to assist a peace officer 

(1) A person commits the offense of refusing to assist a peace officer if upon command by a person known by the person to be a peace officer the person unreasonably refuses or fails to assist in effecting an authorized arrest or preventing another from committing a crime.

(2) Refusing to assist a peace officer is a Class B violation. [1971 c.743 §199; 1999 c.1051 §150]

Pennsylvania

2012 Pennsylvania Consolidated Statutes
Title 42 - Judiciary and Judicial Procedure
Chapter 91 - Detainers and Extradition
Section 9130 - Authority of arresting officer

§ 9130.  Authority of arresting officer.
Every such peace officer or other person empowered to make the arrest shall have the same authority in arresting the accused to command assistance therein as peace officers have by law in the execution of any criminal process directed to them, with like penalties against those who refuse their assistance.

Rhode Island

2005 Rhode Island Code
§ 12-9-11 - Commanding assistance in execution of warrant 

Every peace officer, or other person empowered to make the arrest, shall have the same authority, in arresting the accused, to command assistance in the arrest as peace officers have by law in the execution of any criminal process directed to them, with like penalties against those who refuse their assistance.

South Carolina

Title 23 - Law Enforcement and Public Safety
Chapter 15 - General Powers and Duties of Sheriffs and Deputy Sheriffs

Section 23-15-70. Call out for assistance or posse comitatus; penalty for refusing to assist.

Any sheriff, deputy sheriff, constable or other officer specially empowered may call out the bystanders or posse comitatus of the proper county to his assistance whenever he is resisted or has reasonable grounds to suspect and believe that such assistance will be necessary in the service or execution of process in any criminal case and any deputy sheriff may call out such posse comitatus to assist in enforcing the laws and in arresting violators or suspected violators thereof. Any person refusing to assist as one of the posse comitatus in the service or execution of such process, when required by the sheriff, deputy sheriff, constable or other officer shall be liable to be indicted therefor and upon conviction shall be fined and imprisoned, at the discretion of the court any person who shall fail to respond and render assistance when summoned by a deputy sheriff to assist in enforcing the laws and in arresting violators or suspected violators thereof shall be guilty of a misdemeanor and, upon conviction shall be fined not less than thirty nor more than one hundred dollars or imprisoned for thirty days.

South Dakota

23-24-10 - Authority of arresting officer

Authority of arresting officer. Every such peace officer or other person empowered to make the arrest, shall have the same authority, in arresting the accused, to command assistance therein, as peace officers have by law in the execution of any criminal process directed to them, with like penalties against those who refuse their assistance.

Tennessee

Title 6: Law Enforcement
Chapter 1: Police and Arrest
Hendersonville, TN
6-110. Policemen may require assistance in making arrests.

It shall be unlawful for any male person to willfully refuse to aid a policeman in making a lawful arrest when such a person's assistance is requested by the policeman and is reasonably necessary to effect the arrest. (Ord. #1970-36, Sept. 1970)

Texas

Art. 2.14. May Summon Aid.

Whenever a peace officer meets with resistance in discharging any duty imposed upon him by law, he shall summon a sufficient number of citizens of his county to overcome the resistance; and all persons summoned are bound to obey.

Art. 2.15. Person Refusing to Aid. The peace officer who has summoned any person to assist him in performing any duty shall report such person, if he refuse to obey, to the proper district or county attorney, in order that he may be prosecuted for the offense.

Utah

Title 76 - Utah Criminal Code
Chapter 8: Offenses Against the Administration of Government
76-8-307.   Failure to aid peace officer.

A person is guilty of a class B misdemeanor if, upon command by a peace officer identifiable or identified by him as such, he unreasonably fails or refuses to aid the peace officer in effecting an arrest or in preventing the commission of any offense by another person.

Vermont

Title 24: Municipal and County Government
Chapter 5: County Officers; Powers and Duties

§ 300. May require assistance 

A sheriff or other officer in the discharge of the duties of his office, for the preservation of the peace, or the suppression or prevention of any criminal matter or cause, may require suitable assistance.

§ 301. Penalty for refusal to assist 

A person being required in the name of the state by a sheriff, deputy sheriff, high bailiff, deputy bailiff or constable, who neglects or refuses to assist such an officer in the execution of his office, in a criminal cause, or in the preservation of the peace, or in the apprehension and securing of a person for a breach of the peace, or in a search and seizure of intoxicating liquors or in transporting such liquors when seized, or in a case of escape or rescue of persons arrested on civil process, shall be fined not more than $500.00, unless the circumstances under which his assistance is called for amount to a riot, in which case he shall be imprisoned not more than six months or fined not more than $100.00, or both.

Virginia

Code of Virginia
Title 18.2 - Crimes and offences generally
Chapter 10 - Crimes Against the Administration of Justice
§ 18.2-463. Refusal to aid officer in execution of his office.

If any person on being required by any sheriff or other officer refuse or neglect to assist him: (1) in the execution of his office in a criminal case, (2) in the preservation of the peace, (3) in the apprehending or securing of any person for a breach of the peace, or (4) in any case of escape or rescue, he shall be guilty of a Class 2 misdemeanor.

§ 18.2-464. Failure to obey order of conservator of the peace.

If any person, being required by a conservator of the peace on view of a breach of the peace or other offense to bring before him the offender, refuse or neglect to obey the conservator of the peace, he shall be guilty of a Class 2 misdemeanor; and if the conservator of the peace declare himself or be known to be such to the person so refusing or neglecting, ignorance of his office shall not be pleaded as an excuse.

Washington

RCW 9A.76.030
Refusing to summon aid for a peace officer

(1) A person is guilty of refusing to summon aid for a peace officer if, upon request by a person he or she knows to be a peace officer, he or she unreasonably refuses or fails to summon aid for such peace officer.

(2) Refusing to summon aid for a peace officer is a misdemeanor

Washington D.C.

TBC

West Virginia

West Virginia Code
Chapter 61. Crimes and Their Punishments.
Article 5. Crimes Against Public Justice.

§61-5-14. Refusal of person to aid officer; penalty.

If any person shall, on being required by any sheriff or other officer, refuse or neglect to assist him in the execution of his office in a criminal case, or in the preservation of the peace, or the apprehending or securing of any person for a breach of the peace, or in any case of escape or rescue, he shall be guilty of a misdemeanor, and, upon conviction, shall be confined in jail not more than six months and be fined not exceeding one hundred dollars.

Wisconsin

Chapter 946: Crimes Against Government and its Administration
Subchapter IV: Interference With Law Enforcement

946.40  Refusing to aid officer.

(1) Whoever, without reasonable excuse, refuses or fails, upon command, to aid any person known by the person to be a peace officer is guilty of a Class C misdemeanor.
(2) This section does not apply if under the circumstances the officer was not authorized to command such assistance.

Wyoming

Title 7 - Criminal Procedure
Chapter 1 - General Provisions

7-3-209. Authority of person making arrest to command assistance.

Every officer or other person authorized by the governor to make the arrest has the same authority in arresting the accused to command assistance as sheriffs and other officers have in the execution of any criminal process directed to them, with the like penalties against those who refuse their assistance.

See also
 Warren v. District of Columbia
 Town of Castle Rock v. Gonzales

References

Law enforcement in the United States
Common law